The following are the national records in athletics in Iraq maintained by Iraqi Amateur Athletic Federation (IAAF).

Outdoor

Key to tables:

+ = en route to a longer distance

h = hand timing

# = not officially recognised by IAAF

Men

Women

Indoor

Men

Women

Notes

References
General
World Athletics Statistic Handbook 2022: National Outdoor Records
World Athletics Statistic Handbook 2022: National Indoor Records
Specific

External links

Iraq
Records
Athletics
Athletics